The Second Europaturnier was held from 8 to 14 September 1941 in Munich. The event was organised by Ehrhardt Post, the Chief Executive of Nazi Grossdeutscher Schachbund. The First Europaturnier had taken place in Stuttgart in May 1939.

Results
The event was won by Gösta Stoltz, who scored a spectacular victory with 1½ points ahead of Alexander Alekhine and Erik Lundin. Stoltz won 1,000 Reichsmarks and received a trophy that was donated by Bavarian Ministerpräsident at the time Ludwig Siebert. The trophy was made of Meissen porcelain and worth close to $1,000.

The results and standings:
{|class="wikitable" style="margin: 1em auto 1em auto; "
|  style="background:#f0f0f0;"|# 
|  style="background:#f0f0f0;"|Player
|  style="background:#f0f0f0;"|Country
|  style="background:#f0f0f0;"|1
|  style="background:#f0f0f0;"|2
|  style="background:#f0f0f0;"|3
|  style="background:#f0f0f0;"|4
|  style="background:#f0f0f0;"|5
|  style="background:#f0f0f0;"|6
|  style="background:#f0f0f0;"|7
|  style="background:#f0f0f0;"|8
|  style="background:#f0f0f0;"|9
|  style="background:#f0f0f0;"|10
|  style="background:#f0f0f0;"|11
|  style="background:#f0f0f0;"|12
|  style="background:#f0f0f0;"|13
|  style="background:#f0f0f0;"|14
|  style="background:#f0f0f0;"|15
|  style="background:#f0f0f0;"|16
|  style="background:#f0f0f0;"|Total
|-
| 1|| Gösta Stoltz ||  ||x ||½ ||1 ||0 ||1 ||1 ||1 ||½ ||1 ||½ ||1 ||1 ||1 ||½ ||1 ||1 || 12
|-
| 2-3|| Alexander Alekhine ||  ||½ ||x ||½ ||1 ||0 ||1 ||½ ||1 ||1 ||1 ||½ ||½ ||0 ||1 ||1 ||1 || 10½
|-
| 2-3|| Erik Lundin ||  ||0 ||½ ||x ||0 ||½ ||1 ||½ ||1 ||½ ||1 ||1 ||1 ||1 ||1 ||½ ||1 || 10½
|-
| 4|| Efim Bogoljubow ||  ||1 ||0 ||1 ||x ||½ ||0 ||½ ||½ ||0 ||1 ||½ ||1 ||½ ||1 ||1 ||1 || 9½
|-
| 5-6|| Bjørn Nielsen ||  ||0 ||1 ||½ ||½ ||x ||1 ||½ ||½ ||0 ||½ ||0 ||1 ||½ ||1 ||1 ||1 || 9
|-
| 5-6|| Kurt Richter ||  ||0 ||0 ||0 ||1 ||0 ||x ||½ ||0 ||1 ||1 ||1 ||1 ||1 ||1 ||1 ||½ || 9
|-
| 7|| Jan Foltys ||  ( Bohemia and Moravia) ||0 ||½ ||½ ||½ ||½ ||½ ||x ||1 ||½ ||0 ||½ ||1 ||1 ||0 ||1 ||½ || 8
|-
| 8|| Pál Réthy ||  ||½ ||0 ||0 ||½ ||½ ||1 ||0 ||x ||0 ||½ ||½ ||½ ||1 ||1 ||½ ||1 || 7½
|-
| 9-10|| Braslav Rabar ||  ||0 ||0 ||½ ||1 ||1 ||0 ||½ ||1 ||x ||½ ||0 ||0 ||½ ||½ ||1 ||½ || 7
|-
| 9-10|| Georg Kieninger ||  ||½ ||0 ||0 ||0 ||½ ||0 ||1 ||½ ||½ ||x ||½ ||1 ||½ ||½ ||½ ||1 || 7
|-
| 11|| Géza Füster ||  ||0 ||½ ||0 ||½ ||1 ||0 ||½ ||½ ||1 ||½ ||x ||0 ||1 ||0 ||0 ||1 || 6½
|-
| 12|| Paul Mross ||  (General Government) ||0 ||½ ||0 ||0 ||0 ||0 ||0 ||½ ||1 ||0 ||1 ||x ||½ ||1 ||½ ||1 || 6
|-
| 13|| Karel Opočenský ||  ( Bohemia and Moravia) ||0 ||1 ||0 ||½ ||½ ||0 ||0 ||0 ||½ ||½ ||0 ||½ ||x ||½ ||1 ||½ || 5½
|-
| 14-15|| Ivan Vladimir Rohaček ||  ||½ ||0 ||0 ||0 ||0 ||0 ||1 ||0 ||½ ||½ ||1 ||0 ||½ ||x ||½ ||0 || 4½
|-
| 14-15|| Nicolaas Cortlever ||  ||0 ||0 ||½ ||0 ||0 ||0 ||0 ||½ ||0 ||½ ||1 ||½ ||0 ||½ ||x ||1 || 4½
|-
| 16|| Peter Leepin ||  ||0 ||0 ||0 ||0 ||0 ||½ ||½ ||0 ||½ ||0 ||0 ||0 ||½ ||1 ||0 ||x || 3
|}

Max Euwe's rejection
Former world champion Max Euwe declined the invitation due to "occupational obligations" as manager of a groceries business. He would later decline the invitation to a similar event, Salzburg 1942 chess tournament due to illness. It is speculated that the real motive was the invitation of Alexander Alekhine, who had written antisemitic articles. Among others, Alekhine had written about the "Jewish clique" around  Euwe in the World Chess Championship 1935.

References

Chess competitions
Chess in Germany
1941 in chess
Sports competitions in Munich
1940s in Munich
1941 in German sport
International sports competitions hosted by Germany
September 1941 sports events